The 1910–11 United States collegiate men's ice hockey season was the 17th season of collegiate ice hockey.

Regular season

Standings

References

1910–11 NCAA Standings

External links
College Hockey Historical Archives

 
College